The Prioksky constituency (No. 130) is a Russian legislative constituency in Nizhny Novgorod Oblast. Until 2007 it covered southwestern Nizhny Novgorod Oblast, including Arzamas, Sarov and Vyksa. In 2016 most of former Arzamassky constituency was placed into Prioksky constituency, which was stretched to the Prioksky District of Nizhny Novgorod, however, the constituency lost its western part.

Members elected

Election Results

1993

|-
! colspan=2 style="background-color:#E9E9E9;text-align:left;vertical-align:top;" |Candidate
! style="background-color:#E9E9E9;text-align:left;vertical-align:top;" |Party
! style="background-color:#E9E9E9;text-align:right;" |Votes
! style="background-color:#E9E9E9;text-align:right;" |%
|-
|style="background-color:"|
|align=left|Sergey Voronov
|align=left|Independent
|
|17.94%
|-
|style="background-color:"|
|align=left|Boris Pevnitsky
|align=left|Independent
|
|15.70%
|-
|style="background-color:"|
|align=left|Vladimir Zhukov
|align=left|Independent
|
|13.88%
|-
|style="background-color:"|
|align=left|Bronislav Puchkov
|align=left|Agrarian Party
|
|13.02%
|-
|style="background-color:"|
|align=left|Yury Belimov
|align=left|Independent
|
|5.78%
|-
|style="background-color:#DBB726"|
|align=left|Aleksandr Panteleyev
|align=left|Democratic Party
|
|5.59%
|-
|style="background-color:"|
|align=left|Pyotr Tiflov
|align=left|Independent
|
|4.10%
|-
|style="background-color:"|
|align=left|Valentin Kostin
|align=left|Independent
|
|2.57%
|-
|style="background-color:#E9E26E"|
|align=left|Vladimir Kudryashov
|align=left|Russian Democratic Reform Movement
|
|1.43%
|-
|style="background-color:#000000"|
|colspan=2 |against all
|
|12.46%
|-
| colspan="5" style="background-color:#E9E9E9;"|
|- style="font-weight:bold"
| colspan="3" style="text-align:left;" | Total
| 
| 100%
|-
| colspan="5" style="background-color:#E9E9E9;"|
|- style="font-weight:bold"
| colspan="4" |Source:
|
|}

1995

|-
! colspan=2 style="background-color:#E9E9E9;text-align:left;vertical-align:top;" |Candidate
! style="background-color:#E9E9E9;text-align:left;vertical-align:top;" |Party
! style="background-color:#E9E9E9;text-align:right;" |Votes
! style="background-color:#E9E9E9;text-align:right;" |%
|-
|style="background-color:"|
|align=left|Ivan Nikitchuk
|align=left|Communist Party
|
|23.17%
|-
|style="background-color:"|
|align=left|Sergey Voronov (incumbent)
|align=left|Independent
|
|19.19%
|-
|style="background-color:"|
|align=left|Vladimir Belozerov
|align=left|Agrarian Party
|
|6.76%
|-
|style="background-color:#019CDC"|
|align=left|Zoya Zaytseva
|align=left|Party of Russian Unity and Accord
|
|5.57%
|-
|style="background-color:"|
|align=left|Genrikh Katrayev
|align=left|Liberal Democratic Party
|
|5.21%
|-
|style="background-color:"|
|align=left|Sergey Naumov
|align=left|Independent
|
|5.04%
|-
|style="background-color:#FE4801"|
|align=left|Pyotr Khven
|align=left|Pamfilova–Gurov–Lysenko
|
|4.90%
|-
|style="background-color:"|
|align=left|Boris Pevnitsky
|align=left|Independent
|
|4.32%
|-
|style="background-color:"|
|align=left|Vladimir Savin
|align=left|Independent
|
|4.26%
|-
|style="background-color:#959698"|
|align=left|Aleksandr Kulagin
|align=left|Derzhava
|
|4.18%
|-
|style="background-color:"|
|align=left|Yury Leonov
|align=left|Independent
|
|2.83%
|-
|style="background-color:"|
|align=left|Mikhail Lemeshev
|align=left|Power to the People
|
|2.05%
|-
|style="background-color:#2C299A"|
|align=left|Anatoly Slyusarev
|align=left|Congress of Russian Communities
|
|1.72%
|-
|style="background-color:"|
|align=left|Mikhail Yermakov
|align=left|Independent
|
|1.48%
|-
|style="background-color:#000000"|
|colspan=2 |against all
|
|6.97%
|-
| colspan="5" style="background-color:#E9E9E9;"|
|- style="font-weight:bold"
| colspan="3" style="text-align:left;" | Total
| 
| 100%
|-
| colspan="5" style="background-color:#E9E9E9;"|
|- style="font-weight:bold"
| colspan="4" |Source:
|
|}

1999

|-
! colspan=2 style="background-color:#E9E9E9;text-align:left;vertical-align:top;" |Candidate
! style="background-color:#E9E9E9;text-align:left;vertical-align:top;" |Party
! style="background-color:#E9E9E9;text-align:right;" |Votes
! style="background-color:#E9E9E9;text-align:right;" |%
|-
|style="background-color:"|
|align=left|Ivan Nikitchuk (incumbent)
|align=left|Independent
|
|30.04%
|-
|style="background-color:"|
|align=left|Boris Mokhov
|align=left|Independent
|
|24.02%
|-
|style="background-color:"|
|align=left|Aleksandr Borodin
|align=left|Independent
|
|9.72%
|-
|style="background-color:"|
|align=left|Yevgeny Anisimov
|align=left|Independent
|
|8.61%
|-
|style="background-color:"|
|align=left|Yelena Naumova
|align=left|Independent
|
|4.05%
|-
|style="background-color:"|
|align=left|Aleksandr Kurdyumov
|align=left|Liberal Democratic Party
|
|3.25%
|-
|style="background-color:"|
|align=left|Boris Fedyakov
|align=left|Independent
|
|2.85%
|-
|style="background-color:#FF4400"|
|align=left|Nikolay Stadnikov
|align=left|Andrey Nikolayev and Svyatoslav Fyodorov Bloc
|
|2.54%
|-
|style="background-color:"|
|align=left|Viktor Gamov
|align=left|Communist Party
|
|1.60%
|-
|style="background-color:#084284"|
|align=left|Viktor Timin
|align=left|Spiritual Heritage
|
|0.56%
|-
|style="background-color:#000000"|
|colspan=2 |against all
|
|10.86%
|-
| colspan="5" style="background-color:#E9E9E9;"|
|- style="font-weight:bold"
| colspan="3" style="text-align:left;" | Total
| 
| 100%
|-
| colspan="5" style="background-color:#E9E9E9;"|
|- style="font-weight:bold"
| colspan="4" |Source:
|
|}

2003

|-
! colspan=2 style="background-color:#E9E9E9;text-align:left;vertical-align:top;" |Candidate
! style="background-color:#E9E9E9;text-align:left;vertical-align:top;" |Party
! style="background-color:#E9E9E9;text-align:right;" |Votes
! style="background-color:#E9E9E9;text-align:right;" |%
|-
|style="background-color:"|
|align=left|Anatoly Kozeradsky
|align=left|United Russia
|
|45.65%
|-
|style="background-color:"|
|align=left|Ivan Nikitchuk (incumbent)
|align=left|Communist Party
|
|25.52%
|-
|style="background-color:"|
|align=left|Tatyana Shchavleva
|align=left|Independent
|
|5.22%
|-
|style="background-color:"|
|align=left|Aleksandr Kochetkov
|align=left|Liberal Democratic Party
|
|4.16%
|-
|style="background-color:#164C8C"|
|align=left|Aleksandr Kulagin
|align=left|United Russian Party Rus'
|
|2.74%
|-
|style="background-color:"|
|align=left|Yury Bardin
|align=left|Independent
|
|2.23%
|-
|style="background-color:"|
|align=left|Boris Fedyakov
|align=left|Independent
|
|1.69%
|-
|style="background-color:#000000"|
|colspan=2 |against all
|
|11.28%
|-
| colspan="5" style="background-color:#E9E9E9;"|
|- style="font-weight:bold"
| colspan="3" style="text-align:left;" | Total
| 
| 100%
|-
| colspan="5" style="background-color:#E9E9E9;"|
|- style="font-weight:bold"
| colspan="4" |Source:
|
|}

2016

|-
! colspan=2 style="background-color:#E9E9E9;text-align:left;vertical-align:top;" |Candidate
! style="background-color:#E9E9E9;text-align:left;vertical-align:top;" |Party
! style="background-color:#E9E9E9;text-align:right;" |Votes
! style="background-color:#E9E9E9;text-align:right;" |%
|-
|style="background-color:"|
|align=left|Denis Moskvin
|align=left|United Russia
|
|63.42%
|-
|style="background-color:"|
|align=left|Pavel Belov
|align=left|Liberal Democratic Party
|
|7.92%
|-
|style="background-color:"|
|align=left|Roman Fomin
|align=left|Communist Party
|
|7.83%
|-
|style="background:"| 
|align=left|Igor Bogdanov
|align=left|A Just Russia
|
|7.29%
|-
|style="background:"| 
|align=left|Svetlana Yudina
|align=left|Communists of Russia
|
|3.22%
|-
|style="background:"| 
|align=left|Mikhail Kuznetsov
|align=left|Patriots of Russia
|
|2.15%
|-
|style="background-color:"|
|align=left|Aleksandr Tsapanov
|align=left|Rodina
|
|1.61%
|-
|style="background:"| 
|align=left|Irina Murakhtayeva
|align=left|Yabloko
|
|1.28%
|-
|style="background:"| 
|align=left|Anna Ludina
|align=left|People's Freedom Party
|
|1.14%
|-
|style="background:"| 
|align=left|Valeria Zaytseva
|align=left|Civic Platform
|
|0.90%
|-
| colspan="5" style="background-color:#E9E9E9;"|
|- style="font-weight:bold"
| colspan="3" style="text-align:left;" | Total
| 
| 100%
|-
| colspan="5" style="background-color:#E9E9E9;"|
|- style="font-weight:bold"
| colspan="4" |Source:
|
|}

2021

|-
! colspan=2 style="background-color:#E9E9E9;text-align:left;vertical-align:top;" |Candidate
! style="background-color:#E9E9E9;text-align:left;vertical-align:top;" |Party
! style="background-color:#E9E9E9;text-align:right;" |Votes
! style="background-color:#E9E9E9;text-align:right;" |%
|-
|style="background-color: " |
|align=left|Yevgeny Lebedev
|align=left|United Russia
|148,620
|52.93%
|-
|style="background-color: " |
|align=left|Mikhail Rykhtik
|align=left|Communist Party
|41,062
|14.62%
|-
|style="background-color: " |
|align=left|Anna Tatarintseva
|align=left|A Just Russia — For Truth
|20,527
|7.31%
|-
|style="background-color: " |
|align=left|Aleksandr Bykov
|align=left|Party of Pensioners
|16,489
|5.87%
|-
|style="background-color: " |
|align=left|Yulia Gusyakova
|align=left|New People
|15,826
|5.64%
|-
|style="background-color: " |
|align=left|Nikolay Chernyshov
|align=left|Liberal Democratic Party
|14,280
|5.09%
|-
|style="background-color: " |
|align=left|Igor Kuznetsov
|align=left|Rodina
|11,335
|4.04%
|-
|style="background-color: " |
|align=left|Valeria Viks
|align=left|Party of Growth
|4,374
|1.56%
|-
| colspan="5" style="background-color:#E9E9E9;"|
|- style="font-weight:bold"
| colspan="3" style="text-align:left;" | Total
| 280,802
| 100%
|-
| colspan="5" style="background-color:#E9E9E9;"|
|- style="font-weight:bold"
| colspan="4" |Source:
|
|}

Notes

References 

Russian legislative constituencies
Politics of Nizhny Novgorod Oblast